Steve Hockensmith (born August 17, 1968) is an American author.  He was born in Louisville, Kentucky. He currently lives in California's bay area with his wife, two children, and pet dog.

Biography
Hockensmith is the author of the Holmes on the Range mystery series. The first book in the series, Holmes on the Range (published in 2006), was a finalist for the Edgar, Shamus and Anthony Awards for Best First Novel.

Several of Hockensmith's short stories have been nominated for awards in the mystery field. He won the Short Mystery Fiction Society's Derringer Award for "Erie's Last Day," published in the May 2000 issue of Alfred Hitchcock's Mystery Magazine (AHMM). Two subsequent Larry Erie stories, "Tricks" (AHMM, August 2004) and "The Big Road" (AHMM, May 2005), were finalists for the Shamus Award for Best Short Story from the Private Eye Writers of America (PWA). "The Big Road" was also nominated for the Anthony and Barry Awards. More recently, a Big Red/Old Red story, "Dear Dr. Watson" (published in the February 2007 EQMM), was a finalist for the Anthony Award.

Hockensmith authored the third book in the Quirk Classics series, Pride and Prejudice and Zombies: Dawn of the Dreadfuls, in 2010, as well as its sequel, Pride and Prejudice and Zombies: Dreadfully Ever After in 2011

Bibliography

Novels

Short stories

Notes

External links
 Official website

Living people
1968 births
21st-century American novelists
American male novelists
Indiana University alumni
Writers from Louisville, Kentucky
Writers from California
American male short story writers
21st-century American short story writers
21st-century American male writers
Novelists from Kentucky